I'm Around is the fifth mixtape by American rapper Remy Ma. The mixtape was released on October 31, 2014. I'm Around features a guest appearance from Remy Ma's husband,  rapper Papoose, and DJ Khaled. Production derives from Certifyd, J Notes, and Ted Smooth - among others. The album is the rapper's first official post-prison musical project

Background 
Remy Ma recorded the album shortly after her prison release August 1, 2014. After releasing numerous remixes to popular 2014 hip hop songs , Remy Ma decided to keep the features to a minimum,  speaking of the release of her project Remy Ma stated to MTV News "They're gonna get all me,....“Everybody was like, you gotta reach out to people...I would have loved to do it, but I've been gone for so long, that I just wanted to give the people me."

Track listing 
Credits adapted from the DatPiff website.

References 

2014 mixtape albums
Remy Ma albums
Albums produced by Ron Browz
Albums produced by Buckwild